Diego Pary Rodríguez (born 1977) is a Bolivian Quechua indigenous leader, educator, politician and diplomat. He served as Advisor to the Bolivian Constituent Assembly of 2006-07 and as Vice Minister of Higher Education. From 2011 to 2018 he served as Ambassador of Bolivia to the Organization of American States (OAS) and Concurrent Ambassador of Bolivia to Trinidad and Tobago, Jamaica, Dominica  and The Bahamas. He was Foreign Minister of Bolivia from 2018 until 12 November 2019, following the resignation of Evo Morales.

Biography 
Diego Pary was born in the Quechua community of Chajnacaya, (currently the municipality of Caiza D) in Potosí Department. He began his primary education in 1983 in his community's rural school. In 1987, at 10 years old, Diego was forced to move to the town of Caiza D to continue his secondary education. Diego gained his secondary degree from the Colegio Pablo VI in 1995. 

In 1996, Diego Pary moved to Sucre to continue his professional studies, attending the Universidad Mayor Real y Pontificia de San Francisco Xavier de Chuquisaca. He graduated with a degree in education in 2001.

To continue his academic career, he completed expert studies in indigenous people, human rights, public administration, and international cooperation at the Charles III University of Madrid in 2008 and a Masters in International Commercial Negotiations at the University of Barcelona and Simón Bolivar Andes University in 2014-2015.

Career 
Diego Pary was always connected to his community and committed to his identity, and began his community activities very early in life due to the death of his father, who inculcated him with a vision of community as a rural teacher.

Pary began a career in education while the university was still a place of privilege that was often difficult to access. He was noted for his identification with indigenous peoples, and thus assumed different positions of student leadership in the university.

In 2002, having concluded his career at university, Pary began to train community leaders, people's reporters, union leaders, mayors, and councilors through the Fundación Acción Cultural Loyola (Loyola Cultural Action Foundation, ACLO), who currently hold various positions within the Bolivian state.

In 2005 and 2006, along with indigenous organizations of the Pact of Unity and other professionals, Pary worked on the development of the "Proposal of the Indigenous, Native, Agricultural and Colonizing Organizations to the Constituent Assembly." In 2006, he joined as a member and advisor to the Unified Syndical Confederation of Rural Workers of Bolivia (CSUTCB) and the Syndical Confederation of Intercultural Communities (CSCIB). Also in 2006, he became a permanent advisor to the Constituent Assembly as a representative of the Pacto de Unidad, participating actively in the entire process of drafting the new Political Constitution of Bolivia.

During his years with the Constituent Assembly, he also participated in several international forums and received support from indigenous leaders in Ecuador, Argentina, Colombia, Peru, Venezuela, Uruguay, Brazil, as well as political leaders in South Africa.

Later, to continue working in the field of indigenous rights, he joined the Indigenous People's Development Fund of Latin America and the Caribbean (Fondo para el Desarrollo de los Pueblos Indígenas de América Latina y El Cariba, FILAC). as a Coordinator of the Indigenous Intercultural University and member of the Indigenous Chair.

In November 2008, he became the Vice Minister of Superior Education in Bolivia. In his time in this position, he created the three Indigenous Universities of Bolivia (UNIBOL) and the Plurinational System of Competency Certification, and transformed the Teachers' Training Schools. He also strengthened technical and technological training, creating new institutions in these fields. In addition he created the Artistic Training Schools and in cooperation with member nations of Mercosur promoted university accreditation, even the creation of the Plurinational Agency of Evaluation and Acreditation of Superior University Education of Bolivia.

His contribution was a crucial part of the development and passing of the Education Law No. 70 "Avelino Siñani-Elizardo Pérez" and the Curricular Design of the Educational System of Bolivia.

Ambassador of Bolivia to the OAS (2011–2018) 
In 2011, Pary was named Ambassador of Bolivia to the Organization of American States (OAS) and Concurrent Ambassador of Bolivia to Trinidad and Tobago, Jamaica, Dominica and The Bahamas.

At the OAS, he took on different leadership roles: President and Vice President of the Permanent Council, President of the Interamerican Council for Comprehensive Development, President of the Indigenous Peoples Workgroup, President of the Agenda Subcommission and President of the Declaration of Cochabamba Workgroup. In addition, he was President of the Commission on Judicial and Political Affairs and President of the Commission on Hemispheric Security. During his term he also organized the 42nd General Assembly of the OAS, which took place in Cochabamba in 2012. He also promoted the passing of the Social Charter of the Americas and the American Declaration on Indigenous Rights.

Foreign Minister of Bolivia (2018–2019) 
On September 4, 2018, Pary was appointed as Minister of Foreign Affairs of Bolivia replacing Fernando Huanacuni Mamani. On November 11, 2019, Pary submitted his resignation following the accusations of fraud in the October 20, 2019 Bolivian elections.

Flight and Return to Bolivia 

After the fall of the Morales administration, Pary fled to Nicaragua where he remained until early 2020. He was initially tipped as a potential Presidential candidate for MAS in the upcoming 2020 Bolivian general election. Eventually, former Minister of Economy Luis Arce was nominated as a candidate and elected president. On 19 November 2020, the Chamber of Senators named Pary Ambassador of Bolivia to the United Nations.

References

External links 
 http://www.oas.org/en/member_states/member_state.asp?sCode=BOL
 http://expertoenpueblosindigenas.blogspot.com/2011/05/diego-pary-ex-alumno-de-la-ii-edicion.html

|-

|-
 

Foreign ministers of Bolivia
Permanent Representatives of Bolivia to the Organization of American States
Bolivian diplomats
People from José María Linares Province
Charles III University of Madrid alumni
Bolivian expatriates in Spain
University of Barcelona alumni
Simón Bolívar University (Venezuela) alumni
University of Saint Francis Xavier alumni
1977 births
Living people
21st-century Bolivian politicians